Rafael dos Santos Resende (born 5 March 2000), commonly known as Rafael Resende, is a Brazilian footballer who currently plays for Auda.

Career statistics

Club

Notes

References

2000 births
Living people
Brazilian footballers
Brazilian expatriate footballers
Association football midfielders
UAE Pro League players
Latvian Higher League players
Fluminense FC players
Sharjah FC players
Khor Fakkan Sports Club players
Al Bataeh Club players
FK Auda players
Expatriate footballers in the United Arab Emirates
Expatriate footballers in Latvia
Brazilian expatriate sportspeople in the United Arab Emirates
Brazilian expatriate sportspeople in Latvia